Matzourakis is a Greek surname. Notable people with the surname include:

 Giannis Mantzourakis (born 1949), Greek footballer and manager
 Giorgos Matzourakis (born 1983), Greek footballer 

Greek-language surnames